The 1956 Chatham Cup was the 29th annual nationwide knockout football competition in New Zealand.

The competition was run on a regional basis, with regional associations each holding separate qualifying rounds. Teams taking part in the final rounds are known to have included Eastern Suburbs (Auckland), Rangers (Bay of Plenty), Hamilton Wanderers, Eastern Union (Gisborne), Moturoa (New Plymouth), Colenso Athletic (Hawkes Bay), Wanganui New Settlers, Kiwi United (Manawatu), Masterton Athletic (Wairarapa), Stop Out (Lower Hutt), Shamrock (Christchurch), West End (South Canterbury) and Northern (Dunedin).

The Brigadiers team of Invercargill, which met Shamrock in the 1956 South Island final, was coached by George Roberts. A life member of Western A.F.C. Roberts, a Canterbury representative, had played in five previous Chatham Cup finals.

The 1956 final
Lower Hutt's Stop Out celebrated its jubilee year with a solid win in the final. The team scored early through a header from Jack Sharp, a goal which was followed by a spectacular strike from Brian Sergeant and further goals from Abram Schryvers, and Fred Benge. Shamrock could only manage a consolation goal late on from Ernie Fields.

The Shamrock and Stop Out sides had played each other earlier in 1956 for the Valmai Memorial Trophy with Stop Out winning the Easter fixture.

Results

Regional finals

Quarter-finals

Semi-finals

Final

References

External links
Rec.Sport.Soccer Statistics Foundation New Zealand 1956 page

Chatham Cup
Chatham Cup
Chatham Cup